Jiggs and Maggie in Society is a 1947 American comedy film directed by Edward F. Cline and starring Joe Yule, Renie Riano and Tim Ryan. The film is part of the Jiggs and Maggie series, the first sequel to the 1946 film Bringing Up Father.

Plot
Irish-American matriarch Maggie attempts to gain her family entry into New York's High Society.

Main cast
 Joe Yule as Jiggs 
 Renie Riano as Maggie Jiggs 
 Tim Ryan as Dinty Moore 
 Wanda McKay as Millicent Perker 
 Lee Bonnell as Van De Graft 
 Pat Goldin as Dugan 
 Herbert Evans as Jenkins 
 June Harrison as Nora Jiggs 
 Scott Taylor as Tommy  
 Jimmy Aubrey as McGurk  
 Thayer Roberts as Henchman Pete 
 Richard Irving as Henchman Al 
 William Cabanne as George  
 Dick Ryan as Grogan  
 Constance Purdy as Mrs. Kelsey Chelsea Blackwell  
 Edith Leslie as Mary  
 Helena Dare as Aggie  
 Lesley Farley as Miami
 Betty Blythe as Mrs. Vacuum 
 Marcelle Imhof as Mrs. Heavydoe 
 Dale Carnegie as himself
 Arthur Murray as himself 
 Sheilah Graham as herself

References

Bibliography
 Drew, Bernard A. Motion Picture Series and Sequels: A Reference Guide. Routledge, 2013.

External links

1947 films
American comedy films
American black-and-white films
1947 comedy films
Films directed by Edward F. Cline
Monogram Pictures films
Bringing Up Father
Films based on American comics
Films based on comic strips
Live-action films based on comics
1940s English-language films
1940s American films